is a Japanese Grand Prix motorcycle racer.

Career

Early career
He finished 11th in the 2016 Red Bull MotoGP Rookies Cup, in 2017 he participated in 9 out of 12 races of the 2017 FIM CEV Moto3 Junior World Championship while taking part in the 2017 Red Bull MotoGP Rookies Cup, finishing 5th which earned him a promotion to the FIM CEV Moto3 Junior Championships the following season.

Moto3 World Championship

Asia Talent Team (2018)
He made his Moto3 World Championship debut as a wildcard during 2018 Spanish motorcycle Grand Prix where he finished 15th scoring his maiden point.

Honda Team Asia (2019–2020)

Moto2 World Championship

Idemitsu Honda Team Asia (2021–present)
From 2021, he promoted to Moto2 World Championship riding for Idemitsu Honda Team Asia.

Career statistics

Red Bull MotoGP Rookies Cup

Races by year
(key) (Races in bold indicate pole position, races in italics indicate fastest lap)

FIM CEV Moto3 Junior World Championship

Races by year
(key) (Races in bold indicate pole position, races in italics indicate fastest lap)

Grand Prix motorcycle racing

By season

By class

Races by year
(key) (Races in bold indicate pole position, races in italics indicate fastest lap)

 Half points awarded as less than two thirds of the race distance (but at least three full laps) was completed.

External links

 

2001 births
Living people
Japanese motorcycle racers
Moto3 World Championship riders
Sportspeople from Saitama (city)
Moto2 World Championship riders